Giving Becky a Chance is a 1917 American drama silent film directed by Howard Estabrook, and written by Lois Zellner and Edith Kennedy. The film stars Vivian Martin, Jack Holt, Jack Richardson, Pietro Sosso and Alice Knowland. The film was released on June 7, 1917, by Paramount Pictures.

Plot

Cast 
Vivian Martin as Becky Knight
Jack Holt as Tom Fielding
Jack Richardson as Ross Benson
Pietro Sosso as Mr. Knight
Alice Knowland as Mrs. Knight

See also
 The House That Shadows Built (1931), a short promotional film celebrating Paramount's 20th anniversary, includes a clip from this film.

References

External links 
 

1917 films
1910s English-language films
Silent American drama films
1917 drama films
Paramount Pictures films
American black-and-white films
American silent feature films
1910s American films